Math Mysteries is a collection of five math-related educational video games for the Windows and Macintosh platforms, developed and published by Tom Snyder Productions. The games were designed to fit the NCTM standards at their time of development. The series consists of Math Mysteries: Measurements, Math Mysteries: Whole Numbers, Math Mysteries: Fractions, Math Mysteries: Advanced Whole Numbers and Math Mysteries: Advanced Fractions.

Development

Educational goals 
The series focuses on aiding students who struggle with mathematical problems. Products come with two CD discs. One is the Whole Class CD, which allows teachers to configure specific skills for their students. Students learn to understand problems, collect vital information, work in groups and find the answers to math problems. The other is the Mystery CD, which allows students to independently explore for themselves and reinforce the skills they learned in class.

Reception

Awards

|-
 | 2000
 | Math Mysteries: Advanced Fractions 
 | Parent's Choice Group Approval Winner
 |
|-
 | 2000
 | Math Mysteries
 | Apple Design Award: Best Mac User Interface
 |
|-
 | 2000
 | Math Mysteries
 | Children's Software Revue All Star Software Award
 |
|-
 | 2000
 | Math Mysteries
 | 2000 New Media Competition: Finalist
 |
|-
 | 2000
 | Math Mysteries
 | All Star Software for Schools - Top 100 Titles
 |
|-
 | 2000
 | Math Mysteries
 | MultiMedia Schools Four Star Report Card
 |
|-
 | 2000
 | Math Mysteries
 | Technology & Learning 'Quick Pick'
 |
|}

References

External links
Official website
Children's educational video games
MacOS games
Mathematical education video games
Video games developed in the United States
Video game franchises
Video game franchises introduced in 2000
Windows games